The 2009 J.League Division 1 season is the 45th season of the top-flight club football in Japan and the 17th season since the establishment of J1 League. The season started on March 7, 2009 and ended on December 5, 2009.

A total of eighteen clubs participated in double round-robin format.  At the end of the season, top three clubs received automatic qualification to the following years' AFC Champions League.  Also starting this season, the bottom three clubs were relegated to J2 League by default.

Kashima Antlers became the first Japanese club win J.League Championship in three straight seasons.

Clubs 

The following eighteen clubs will play in J.League Division 1 during the 2009 season.  Of these clubs, Sanfrecce Hiroshima and Montedio Yamagata are the newly promoted clubs.

League format 
Eighteen clubs will play in double round-robin (home and away) format, a total of 34 games each. A club receives 3 points for a win, 1 point for a tie, and 0 points for a loss. The clubs are ranked by points, and tie breakers are, in the following order: 
 Goal differential 
 Goals scored 
 Head-to-head results
 Disciplinary points
A draw would be conducted, if necessary.  However, if two clubs are tied at the first place, both clubs will be declared as the champions. The bottom three clubs will be relegated to J2.  The top three clubs will qualify to AFC Champions League in the following year.
Changes from Previous Year
 Bottom three clubs are relegated by default; during 2004–2008 season, the 16th-place club needed to win playoffs to avoid relegation.
 The fourth foreign player slot (AFC player slot) is introduced

League table

Results

Top scorers 

Notes:

Attendance

Awards

Individual awards

Best eleven

References

J1 League seasons
1
Japan
Japan